The 24th Lumières Awards ceremony, presented by the Académie des Lumières, took place on 4 February 2019 to honour the best in French films of 2018. The nominations were announced on 17 December 2018.

Nominees

See also
 44th César Awards
 9th Magritte Awards

References

External links
 
 
 Lumières Awards at AlloCiné

Lumières
Lumières
2019 in Paris
February 2019 events in France
Lumières Awards